Micromeria microphylla is a species of plants in the family Lamiaceae.

Sources

References 

microphylla